Frank Clancy may refer to:

 Frank Willey Clancy (1852–1928), politician in New Mexico
 Frank Clancy (sheriff) (1890–1955), murder victim
 T. Frank Clancy (1871–1936), politician in Wisconsin